The PZL.3 was a Polish project for a four-engine heavy bomber, designed by Władysław Zalewski from 1928 to 1930 at PZL (Państwowe Zakłady Lotnicze - National Aviation Establishments).

Design and development
At the time of the formation of PZL the Department of Aeronautics gave the nascent design office the task of designing a heavy bomber. Drawing heavily on his 1924 WZ-IX Pteranodon bomber, Zalewski was given the task as designer. During the winter of 1928-29 the detailed design of the PZL.3 bomber took shape, emerging as a large aircraft powered by four  Bristol Jupiter engines mounted in tandem in nacelles on pylons above the wings. Due to the dire economic situation at the start of the 1930s and the expected high costs, funds for construction of a prototype were not forthcoming so the project was dropped.

The PZL.3 would have been a low-wing cantilever monoplane with four engines in push-pull tandem nacelles over the wings mounted on pylons. Built with a semi-monocoque stressed skin fuselage skinned with Duralumin skinning and structural parts, the PZL.3 would have had twin fins and a trousered fixed tail-wheel  undercarriage.

After the PZL.3 was rejected Zalewski left PZL and refused to work on Government sponsored projects thereafter.

This was also produced in France as the Potez 41.

Specifications

See also

References 

1920s Polish bomber aircraft
PZL aircraft